There are a number of elementary schools named Pershing Elementary School:

 Pershing Elementary School (Lincoln, Nebraska)
 Pershing Elementary School (West Allis, Wisconsin)